Thomas Gale (1507–1586) was an English surgeon.  Although earlier books on surgery had been published in English, these were translations of texts from the European continent:  Gale's was the first book on surgery to be written in English.

Gale served with the army of Henry VIII of England in France.

Publications
"Certaine workes of chirurgie" 1563, printed in London by Rouland Hall.

See also
William Clowes (1540–1604)

References

External links

English surgeons
1507 births
1586 deaths
16th-century English medical doctors
English medical writers
16th-century English writers
16th-century male writers
Place of birth missing